In enzymology, a cyclohexane-1,3-dione hydrolase is an enzyme that catalyzes the chemical reaction

cyclohexane-1,3-dione + H2O  5-oxohexanoate

Thus, the two substrates of this enzyme are cyclohexane-1,3-dione and H2O, whereas its product is 5-oxohexanoate.

This enzyme belongs to the family of hydrolases, specifically those acting on carbon-carbon bonds in ketonic substances.  The systematic name of this enzyme class is cyclohexane-1,3-dione acylhydrolase (decyclizing). This enzyme is also called 1,3-cyclohexanedione hydrolase.

References

 

EC 3.7.1
Enzymes of unknown structure